In the mathematical theory of conformal mappings, the area theorem
gives an inequality satisfied by
the power series coefficients of certain conformal mappings.
The theorem is called by that name, not because of its implications, but rather because the proof uses
the notion of area.

Statement
Suppose that  is analytic and injective in the punctured
open unit disk
 and has the power series representation

then the coefficients  satisfy

Proof
Define for 

Then  is a simple closed curve in the plane.
Let  denote the unique bounded connected component of
. The existence and
uniqueness of  follows from Jordan's curve theorem.

If  is a domain in the plane whose boundary
is a smooth simple closed curve ,
then

provided that  is positively oriented
This follows easily, for example, from Green's theorem.
As we will soon see,  is positively oriented around
 (and that is the reason for the minus sign in the
definition of ). After applying the chain rule
the area give

Therefore, the area of  also equals to the average of the two expressions on the right
hand side. After simplification, this yields

where  denotes complex conjugation. We set  and use the power series

(Since  the rearrangement of the terms is justified.)
Now note that  is  if 
and is zero otherwise. Therefore, we get

Therefore, the right hand side
is positive. Since , by letting , the
theorem now follows.

It only remains to justify the claim that  is positively oriented
Let  satisfy , and set
, say. For very small , we may write the
Since,  does
not pass through  when 
of the winding number under homotopy in the complement of 
implies that the winding number of
This implies that  and that 

Uses
The inequalities satisfied by power series coefficients of conformal
mappings were of considerable interest to mathematicians prior to
the solution of the Bieberbach conjecture. The area theorem
is a central tool in this context. Moreover, the area theorem is often
used in order to prove the Koebe 1/4 theorem, which is very
useful in the study of the geometry of conformal mappings.

References

Theorems in complex analysis
Articles containing proofs